An Archchaplain is a cleric with a senior position in a royal court. The title was used in the Frankish kingdom in the Carolingian period.

Holy Roman Archchaplains 

 Willigis (c982-c1007)
 Erkanbald (c1016-c1020)
 Aribo (c1023-c1028)
 Willegis (c1073)

References

Christian religious occupations
Carolingian Empire
History of the Holy Roman Empire